The Port of Dandong is an artificial deep-water seaport on the coast of the city of Dandong, Liaoning Province, People's Republic of China, located at the mouth of the Yalu River, right on the Chinese border with North Korea. It has capacity for very large ships of up to 300,000 DWT. In 2012 it reached a throughput of 96 million metric tons and 125,000 TEU of containers.

References

Ports and harbours of China